John Duncan "Jan" Sturrock OBE (20 March 1915 – 20 July 1974) was an English rower who competed for Great Britain in the 1936 Summer Olympics, where he was a member of the British boat which won the silver medal in the coxless four event.

At the 1938 British Empire Games he was a member of the English boat which won the gold medal in the eight competition.

He was born and died in Weymouth, Dorset.

References

1915 births
1974 deaths
English male rowers
Olympic rowers of Great Britain
Rowers at the 1936 Summer Olympics
Olympic silver medallists for Great Britain
Rowers at the 1938 British Empire Games
Commonwealth Games gold medallists for England
Olympic medalists in rowing
English Olympic medallists
Medalists at the 1936 Summer Olympics
Commonwealth Games medallists in rowing
Officers of the Order of the British Empire
Medallists at the 1938 British Empire Games